is a Japanese rugby union player. He plays as No. 8, currently for Toyota Jido Shokki. He graduated from Meiji University and used to play for Suntory Sungoliath before he went to play professional rugby in France for about one season.

He's a regular at Japan national rugby union team, having played at the 2003 Rugby World Cup finals. He played at full back (No. 15) for the first time for the Steelers versus Suntory in a game on Christmas Day 2004.

He married former Olympic gold medalist swimmer Kyoko Iwasaki.

References

External links
 Yuya Saito

1977 births
Living people
Japanese rugby union players
Rugby union number eights
Japan international rugby union players
Asian Games medalists in rugby union
Rugby union players at the 2002 Asian Games
Tokyo Sungoliath players
Kobelco Kobe Steelers players
Asian Games silver medalists for Japan
Medalists at the 2002 Asian Games